The West of England Combined Authority (WECA) is a combined authority within the West of England area, consisting of the local authorities of Bristol, South Gloucestershire, and Bath and North East Somerset. The body has its headquarters in the Redcliffe area of Bristol, and is led by the Mayor of the West of England. The most recent election for this post took place on 6 May 2021, when the Labour candidate Dan Norris was elected on a turnout of 36%.

Establishment 

Devolution of certain powers to the West of England was announced by the UK government in the 2016 budget. The government's vision was to create a "Western Powerhouse" analogous to the Northern Powerhouse concept. The proposal could bring nearly £1 billion of investment to the region over thirty years.

The original proposal was to cover the same area as the County of Avon which came into formal existence on 1 April 1974 and was abolished in 1996. However, in June 2016 North Somerset council rejected the proposal. Bristol, Bath and North East Somerset and South Gloucestershire councils agreed to proceed without them.

The devolution deal, via the West of England Combined Authority Order 2017, came into force on 9 February 2017. The first public meeting of the combined authority took place on 1 March with an interim chair, followed by the first mayoral election in May.

Population 
The region covered by the combined authority had a population estimated at 950,000 in 2020. The authority also works closely with North Somerset Council; the joint area had a population in 2020 of 1,165,600.

Responsibilities 
The authority's functions, as specified by the West of England Combined Authority Order, mostly cover planning, skills and local transport. In April 2017 the authority published a 207-page constitution which includes terms of reference for the body and its committees. An updated constitution was agreed on 15 July 2019 and 9 June 2020.

Planning, economy and skills

Responsibilities include:
Strategic planning, including a Spatial Development Strategy which will act as the framework for managing planning across the West of England region.
Control of a new additional £30 million a year funding allocation over 30 years, to be invested in the West of England Single Investment Fund, to boost growth.
The 19+ Adult Education budget, which was devolved from the 2019/20 academic year.

Transport
The mayor and combined authority are responsible for a consolidated, devolved local transport budget, with a multi-year settlement. They can franchise bus services, subject to necessary legislation and local consultation.

The authority promotes the West of England Joint Local Transport Plan, which includes the MetroBus network and the MetroWest rail project. The fourth iteration of the plan was published in March 2020.

A Key Route Network of local authority roads is managed and maintained by the combined authority on behalf of the Mayor.

Travelwest is a transport information and advice service promoted by the WECA authorities as well as North Somerset.

In early 2023, about 40 of the 69 subsidised bus routes were expected to be withdrawn due to reductions in the local transport levy, but a new on-call minibus "demand-responsive transport" service would be launched using new government funding which could only be spent on "new and innovative" services. The mayor said he was not yet convinced that using the new bus franchising model introduced by the Bus Services Act 2017, similar to arrangements in London, is suitable for the area, but he would monitor how well franchising works in Manchester when rolled out from 2023 though WECA was not carrying out any detailed analysis of this option.

Budget 
In 2018–19 the authority's income was £26.3m, of which £13m was from levies on the local authorities for WECA's transport functions and £7m came in grants. Expenditure was £25.3m, of which £12.8m was spent on concessionary fares and £1.7m on community transport; £2.6m was transferred to reserves and £2.9m was contributed to the Mayoral Fund. From this fund, which also received £17.6m from business rates, the mayor spent £12m on highways and £7m on transport, as well as £0.7m on the Joint Spatial Plan.

In the October 2021 budget the UK government allocated £540 million to WECA over a five-year period for public transport improvements, to be predominantly spent on improving bus services.

WECA spent £9.6million on staffing in 2022–23 and the mayor requested £17.6million for 2023–24, increased largely to deliver new projects from the additional government transport funding and to cover strategic transport planning responsibility transferred to WECA from constituent councils. After negotiations with council leaders in January 2023, £800,000 of the proposed increase was withheld.

Membership
The membership of the combined authority cabinet is as follows.

Former South Gloucestershire Council leader Cllr Matthew Riddle was chosen to be interim chair of the combined authority until the first elected mayor took office on 8 May 2017, and Marvin Rees was chosen to be vice-chair.

 the authority employed 84, including the staff of the West of England Local Enterprise Partnership and the 'Invest in Bristol and Bath' team.

In 2021 there was a dispute between the members and the Mayor of the West of England over the mayor's powers, in particular a power to veto alternative proposals to the joint committee including North Somerset Council. The four local authorities’ monitoring officers, who give legal advice, stated the veto could arguably amount to maladministration. On 15 October 2021, the four council leaders did not attend a WECA meeting with the mayor, which meant over £50 million of spending decisions could not be made. In November 2021, after taking new legal advice, Norris agreed not to claim veto powers on decisions involving North Somerset.

History 

In 2022, WECA moved from offices near Bristol Temple Meads railway station, to larger offices in a four-storey building in nearby Redcliffe.

In May 2022, WECA's external auditors, Grant Thornton, initiated an investigation into strained relationships within WECA, after identifying a consequent "risk of significant weakness" in value-for-money arrangements. Grant Thornton also examined the issue of senior staff leaving, which they considered could be "highly problematic". WECA's draft 2021/2022 accounts show it spent nearly £9 million on staff salaries, £892,000 over budget. The auditors' report became available to the public in November 2022. It criticised WECA leaders for having a "poor state of professional relationships", and found five "significant weaknesses" in value-for-money arrangements. It made three legally-binding "statutory recommendations", two "key recommendations" and four "implementation recommendations". Grant Thornton issued such recommendations in only 3% of local authority reports it made that year. The Department for Levelling Up, Housing and Communities placed WECA on a monitoring watchlist, so if there is not improvement this could result in a "best value" improvement panel being imposed or government best value inspectors taking over control of WECA.

Potential changes 
In 2018, Mayor Tim Bowles voiced hope that North Somerset would join the combined authority, saying: "We work closely on a regular basis with Nigel [Ashton, then leader of the council] and his officers on a number of things. Personally I hope they do, and there are lots of people in North Somerset who hope they do too". In October 2020 there were discussions around North Somerset joining the WECA in time for the May 2021 election; however Marvin Rees, mayor of Bristol, voted down this proposal in early 2021. He rejected it on the basis that there should be a financial offer from the government for the council's inclusion, and stated that he would like to see North Somerset joining in the future. In 2020, North Somerset Council leader Don Davies said he regretted the decision not to join. In 2021, Dan Norris the newly elected mayor showed his interest in North Somerset council joining but also the rest of Somerset.

George Ferguson, Mayor of Bristol from 2012 to 2016, suggested in 2019 that his former role should be abolished and the combined authority renamed the "Bristol and Bath City Region", saying "Even when I stood for Bristol mayor back in 2012 I said I would prefer that we had a metro mayor. But a directly elected mayor for Bristol is what we had on offer from the government at the time".

References

External links
 
  H.M. Treasury proposed devolution agreement, March 2016

Combined authorities
Politics of Bristol
Politics of Bath and North East Somerset
Politics of South Gloucestershire District